Sophronia santolinae is a moth of the family Gelechiidae. It was described by Staudinger in 1863. It is found in Spain.

The larvae feed on Santolina rosmarinifolia.

References

Moths described in 1863
Sophronia (moth)